Alert is an unincorporated community in Jackson Township, Decatur County, Indiana.

History
Alert was laid out in 1886.

References

Unincorporated communities in Decatur County, Indiana
Unincorporated communities in Indiana